Daniel Dale Crabtree (born August 10, 1956) is a United States district judge of the United States District Court for the District of Kansas.

Biography

Crabtree received a Bachelor of Arts degree in 1978 from Ottawa University. He received a Juris Doctor in 1981 from the University of Kansas School of Law. He has spent his entire law career at the law firm of Stinson Morrison Hecker LLP (now Stinson Leonard Street LLP), starting as an associate in 1981 and becoming a partner in 1988. He has represented businesses and governmental entities in complex civil litigation in federal and state courts. He also serves as General Counsel to the Kansas City Royals Baseball Club. He has also served as a Member, Board of Directors and Executive Committee, of the Providence Medical Center and St. John Hospital.

Federal judicial service

On August 1, 2013, President Barack Obama nominated Crabtree to serve as a United States District Judge of the United States District Court for the District of Kansas, to the seat vacated by Judge John Watson Lungstrum, who assumed senior status on November 2, 2010. On January 16, 2014, his nomination was reported out of committee. On April 11, 2014, Senate Majority Leader Harry Reid filed a motion to invoke cloture on the nomination. On April 29, 2014, the United States Senate invoked cloture on his nomination by a 57–39 vote. On April 30, 2014, his nomination was confirmed by a 94–0 vote. He received his judicial commission on May 1, 2014.

References

External links

1956 births
Living people
Kansas lawyers
Judges of the United States District Court for the District of Kansas
Ottawa University alumni
United States district court judges appointed by Barack Obama
21st-century American judges
University of Kansas School of Law alumni